The 1957 Australian Drivers' Championship was a CAMS-sanctioned Australian motor racing title for drivers of Formula Libre cars. The championship was contested over a nine race series with the winner awarded the 1957 CAMS Gold Star. It was the first Australian Drivers' Championship and the first motor racing title to be decided over a series of races at Australian circuits.

The series was won by Victorian racer Lex Davison driving a Ferrari 500/625. Davison dominated the championship, winning six of the nine races, including the series-opening 1957 Australian Grand Prix, to finish 19 points ahead of Tom Hawkes (Cooper T23 Bristol). The other drivers to win races were Murray Trenberth (Vincent 1000), Arnold Glass (HWM Jaguar) and Stan Jones (Maserati 250F).

Calendar

The championship was contested over a nine race series.

Shortly after the running of the Victorian Trophy, the Confederation of Australian Motor Sport announced that it had introduced an annual "Gold Star" award for the champion Australian racing driver, with the Australian Grand Prix and the Victorian Trophy being retrospectively included in the list of nominated races counting towards the inaugural championship.

Points system
Championship points were awarded on an 8-5-3-2-1 basis for the first five places at each race.

Points table

At the Australian Grand Prix race at Caversham Lex Davison shared the winning car with Bill Patterson and championship points were allotted in proportion to the laps driven by each.

Championship name
The championship was referred to by the Confederation of Australian Motor Sport at the time simply as "The CAMS Gold Star". However the actual Gold Star medallion was inscribed with the words "Champion Australian Driver" and historical records published by CAMS use the term "Australian Drivers' Championship".

References

Further reading
 CAMS Gold Star Award, Points score up to and including Wakefield Trophy, Australian Motor Sports, November 1957, page 445
 First Gold Star, Australian Motor Sports, January 1958, page 7

Australian Drivers' Championship
Drivers' Championship